Joan Harrison may refer to:

 Joan Harrison (screenwriter) (1907–1994), English screenwriter and producer
 Joan Harrison (swimmer) (born 1935), South African swimmer